Uruwala Valagamba Raja Maha Vihara (Sinhalaː ඌරුවල වලගම්බා රජ මහා විහාරය) is an ancient Buddhist temple in Uruwala, Sri Lanka. The temple is located on Wathurugama road and approximately 4.71 km (2.93 mi) away from Miriswatta junction. The temple has been formally recognized by the Government as an archaeological site in Sri Lanka.

See also
 List of Archaeological Protected Monuments in Sri Lanka

References

External links
 Uruwala Walagamba Rajamaha Viharaya,Buthpitiya - YouTube

Buddhist temples in Gampaha District
Archaeological protected monuments in Gampaha District